

Unitary authorities
Whole council
In 25 English unitary authorities the whole council was up for election.

Third of council

In 20 English unitary authorities one third of the council was up for election.

Unitary boroughs